"If You Should Sail" is a song by American duo Nielsen Pearson. It was released as a single in 1980 from their self-titled album.

The song peaked at No. 38 on the Billboard Hot 100 and No. 35 on the Adult Contemporary chart, becoming the duo's only top 40 hit.

Chart performance

See also
List of one-hit wonders in the United States

References

1980 singles
1980 songs
Capitol Records singles